Rowthorn Tunnel is a former railway tunnel between  and  stations southeast of Chesterfield, Derbyshire, England. Some sources refer to the tunnel as "Rowthorne".

Context
The tunnel was built by the Midland Railway on the circuitous Barrow Hill to Pleasley West line known as "The Doe Lea Branch", because it ran for much of its length along the valley of the River Doe Lea.

Structure
The line from the north approached on a gradient of 1 in 50 which continued through the tunnel, making it very difficult to work coal trains southwards.

History
The line was opened without ceremony on 1 September 1890.

Normal passenger traffic along the branch dwindled over the years and finally ceased on 28 July 1930. Glapwell Colliery, to the north of the tunnel was still going strong at this time.

After closure the tunnel found two new uses, first as a mushroom farm then, during the Second World War, as an ammunition store. It has since been filled in.

References

Sources

Further reading

External links
Rowthorn Tunnel on an Edwardian 6" OS map National Library of Scotland
Rowthorn Tunnel on a navigable 1947 OS map npe Maps
The line and tunnel on various maps with overlays Rail Map Online
The line and mileages, the tunnel lay between the station and the junction with BOC2 Railway Codes

Railway tunnels in England
Tunnels in Derbyshire